The rowing competition at the 1987 Pan American Games in Indianapolis, Indiana, took place at Eagle Creek Park.

Men's events

Women's events

Medal table

Events at the 1987 Pan American Games
Rowing at the Pan American Games
Rowing competitions in the United States
1987 in rowing